Addison Fatta (born November 23, 2004) is an American artistic gymnast.  She is a member of the United States national gymnastics team.

Early life 
Fatta was born to Tony and Jen Fatta in 2004 in Lancaster, Pennsylvania.  She started gymnastics in 2005.

Gymnastics career

Junior

2017–19 
Fatta qualified as an elite-level gymnast in 2017.  She competed at the American Classic, the U.S. Classic, and at her first National Championships.

In 2018 Fatta only competed at the American Classic and the U.S. Classic.

In 2019, her last year as a junior level gymnast, Fatta competed at the U.S. Classic and at the 2019 National Championships.  She finished 13th in the all-around.

Senior

2021 
Fatta competed at the Winter Cup where she placed seventh in the all-around. In late May Fatta competed at the U.S. Classic where she only competed on uneven bars and balance beam.  In June she competed at her first senior-level National Championships.  She placed sixteenth in the all-around but qualified to compete at the upcoming Olympic Trials.  Additionally she was named to the national team for the first time. At the Olympic Trials Fatta finished eleventh in the all-around.

2022 
Fatta competed at the 2022 Winter Cup where she placed eleventh in the all-around. In July Fatta was selected as the alternate for the Pan American Championships team.

In August Fatta competed at the National Championships.  She finished finished tenth in the all-around. In September Fatta competed at the Szombathely Challenge World Cup alongside Katelyn Jong and Levi Jung-Ruivivar.  While there Fatta won gold on vault and bronze on the uneven bars.

In November Fatta signed her National Letter of Intent with the Oklahoma Sooners.

Competitive history

References

External links
 
 

2004 births
Living people
American female artistic gymnasts
U.S. women's national team gymnasts
Sportspeople from Pennsylvania
21st-century American women